Road routes in the Northern Territory assist drivers navigating roads throughout the territory, by identifying important through-routes. The Northern Territory's National Highways are the main routes connecting Darwin to the adjacent states of Queensland, South Australia, and Western Australia. National Routes spur off the National Highways, and are other routes of national importance, while the remaining significant routes are designated as State Routes.

According to the Roads & Maritime Services, the Northern Territory has begun converting their numbered routes to alphanumeric routes, with a "progressive replacement" scheme that sees alphanumeric route markers introduced only when signs are replaced. The table below has a list of most signed alphanumeric routes.

Alphanumeric routes
Below are the existing alpha numeric routes as of November 2020. Even though the Northern Territory has been converting to alphanumerics for more than two decades, only four routes are fully signed, and a former State Route 23 that is missing a letter in all of its signs and just says "23". Signage in the Northern Territory is very inconsistent. For example C24 in not signed at the Stuart Highway junction but signed further into the route. Most signs were like this and as such very few routes have been signed in the Northern Territory.

Roads of National Significance (A routes) 

A-Routes are major roads that link major destinations like  Stuart Highway which connects Darwin to Adelaide.

Roads of State Significance (B routes) 

B routes are routes that connect major settlements in the State but not eligible for A Rotes due to Road quality.

Routes of Minor significance (C routes) 

These are essentially roads that link minor settlements or areas that aren't eligible for an A or a B route.

National Highways and Routes
There are three national highways and one current existing national route in the Northern Territory.

State Routes
State routes are numbered based on their position in the territory, generally increasing in number from south to north.

See also

List of highways in the Northern Territory

References

 
Northern Territory
Road routes